Almeta Crawford High School, also known simply as Crawford High School, is a public high school under construction in Fort Bend County, Texas. Located near Farm to Market Road 521 and south of State Highway 6, just adjacent to Sienna, Texas, the school is projected to open in the fall of 2023 and will encompass approximately half a million square feet. The school, as Fort Bend Independent School District's (FBISD) 12th consecutive high school, will initially consist of 9th, 10th, and 11th graders in its inaugural year, with the first graduating class expected to be the class of 2025.

History 
Crawford High School was envisioned by FBISD as a method of alleviating overcrowding at Sienna's Ridge Point High School, which opened a decade earlier in 2010. The school will divert students away from RPHS, in addition to Hightower High School, which since mid-2020 had enrolled students previously zoned to Ridge Point, again to combat the latter's excess. The school was initially planned to open for the 2022-2023 school year, however, due to COVID-related construction delays, the district has pushed back its inauguration to the 2023-2024 school year.

Almenta Crawford, who is ACHS's eponym, was a long-time employee at FBISD, serving for under half a century working at the district, mostly at Dulles High School. In March 2021, Keith Fickel, principal of Sugar Land Middle School, was declared to be the school's upcoming principal. On April 7, 2022, the school's mascot was revealed: the chargers.

The attendance boundaries for the school are set to be established during the 2022 fall semester.

Campus 
At , the school will be the largest in FBISD to date. The district has stated that it will be constructed to environmentally sound, green standards. The school will feature "learning communities", featuring a combination of classrooms, laboratories, specialized classes, a multi-purpose room, and collaboration ideas. The school is structured in a V-esque shape, with a central courtyard separating the learning communities from the commons, fine art facilities, auditorium, and career and technical education facilities. The campus will also have three on site gyms, a practice and competition field respectively, a softball field, and a baseball field, in addition to a large field house.

References 

Educational institutions established in 2023
Fort Bend Independent School District high schools
2023 establishments in Texas